Stricker "Strick" Coles (1888-1932) was a college football player and referee, as well as a college baseball player. He played both for Clemson College. He was an end on the football team and an infielder on the baseball team, and was captain of both his senior season. He weighed just 120 pounds when he first joined the football team. He was the younger brother of Cad Coles.

References

1888 births
Players of American football from South Carolina
Clemson Tigers football players
Clemson Tigers baseball players
American football ends
Baseball infielders
American football officials
1932 deaths
People from Rock Hill, South Carolina